AT&T Communications, Inc., was a division of the AT&T Corporation that, through 23 subsidiaries, provided interexchange carrier and long-distance telephone services.

History

AT&T Long Lines 
The American Telephone and Telegraph Long Lines wire, cable, and microwave radio relay network provided long-distance services for AT&T to its customers. The connection to other countries from the United States began here.  By the 1970s, 95% of long-distance and 70% of intercity telephone calls in the United States were carried by AT&T.

Before using microwave relay and coaxial cables, AT&T used open wire lines for long-distance service. In 1911, the system connected New York to Denver. The introduction of repeater towers allowed such connections to reach across North America. Starting in the 1920s, the company increasingly used long-distance coaxial cable and carrier systems.

With improved klystrons and other microwave devices devised during World War II, higher frequencies allowed far more channels on a given link. This allowed a single microwave relay to carry thousands of telephone calls. Bell Labs developed a practical system known as TD-2, produced by Western Electric. The system was designed not only to carry telephone calls, but also television signals, allowing programs to be sent from city to city. Microwaves are line of sight technology, so building such a network required towers built in strings between the endpoints, but this was still much less expensive than stringing the equivalent number of cables between the two points. The first complete system was installed between New York and Chicago and opened on September 1, 1950.

Formal opening of the United States coast-to-coast connection was on August 17, 1951, via AT&T's network control center in New York City.
A presidential address from Harry Truman at the San Francisco Peace Conference on September 4, 1951 opened the network, demonstrating coast-to-coast television service. The first regularly scheduled show to use this was Edward R. Murrow's See It Now on November 18, 1951. Later the network allowed events such as American Bandstand and ABC's Monday Night Football to be broadcast live nationally and permitted distribution of regional sports events, such as Saturday football games prior to the adoption of satellite communications in the 1970s.

While coaxial links continued to connect major US cities, the primary links had moved to the microwave systems by the late 1960s.

By the 1980s, alternatives supplemented what was in place.

Long Lines briefly published a periodical, TWX, targeted to companies that used AT&T's equipment and services, particularly TeletypeWriter eXchange, from which it took its name. The periodical was discontinued in 1952.

Direct distance dialing 

In 1950, New York City's five boroughs could be dialed directly by subscribers from various communities in New Jersey with the digits '1-1' followed by the seven-digit telephone number. While New York City received the area code 212 when AT&T formulated the first nationwide telephone numbering plan in October 1947, it wouldn't be until 1951 when Englewood, New Jersey, customers would dial their calls to New York City using the prefix 212, as well as other area codes to reach many cities in the nation. New York City's five boroughs also had been dialing northeastern New Jersey as 11+ the two letters and five digits of the New Jersey number.

The use of area code 201 to call New Jersey from New York City only began latter in the 1950s. Other cities in northeastern New Jersey were dialable in 1951 (and for a few years prior) from Englewood by simply dialing the two letters of the exchange name and remaining five digits. In addition to New York City, the Nassau County part of Long Island was dialable from Englewood and Teaneck using area code 516. Also Westchester County, Rockland County, and portions of Orange and Putnam Counties were also dialable from Englewood and Teaneck in 1951 using area code 914.

Early in the 20th century, the telephone companies organized a "Separations and Settlements" process by which Long Lines and the local companies divided the revenues of long-distance calls according to their respective costs. The mid-century advent of microwave and other high capacity systems dramatically cut the cost of long-haul operations, but pricing did not decline proportionally. Rather, the local fraction of revenue-sharing rose to subsidize local service.

AT&T Communications 
AT&T Communications became one of the three core sales units of AT&T after reorganization of assets.

AT&T divided AT&T Communications into 22 operating companies, serving the regions of each Bell Operating Company that was spun off. Some of these companies are currently operating:
AT&T Communications of Indiana, G.P.
AT&T Communications of New York, Inc.
AT&T Communications of Virginia, LLC
AT&T Communications of Washington D.C., LLC
The other companies, which have been merged into AT&T Corp., included:
AT&T Communications of California, Inc.
AT&T Communications of Delaware, Inc.
AT&T Communications of Illinois, Inc.
AT&T Communications of Maryland, LLC
AT&T Communications of Michigan, Inc.
AT&T Communications of New England, Inc.
AT&T Communications of Nevada, Inc.
AT&T Communications of NJ, L.P.
AT&T Communications of Ohio, Inc.
AT&T Communications of Pennsylvania, LLC
AT&T Communications of the Midwest, Inc.
AT&T Communications of the Mountain States, Inc.
AT&T Communications of the Pacific Northwest, Inc.
AT&T Communications of the South Central States, LLC
AT&T Communications of the Southern States, LLC
AT&T Communications of the Southwest, Inc.
AT&T Communications of West Virginia, Inc.
AT&T Communications of Wisconsin, L.P.

Following the Telecommunications Act of 1996, AT&T Communications began reselling Bell Operating Company-provided telephone service at lower prices to compete with the Baby Bells. Their names were: Ameritech, Bell Atlantic, BellSouth, NYNEX, Pacific Telesis, Southwestern Bell, and US West.
The advertising campaign which had a broad appeal was named AT&T CallVantage.

AT&T–SBC Communications merger 
In 2005, SBC Communications purchased AT&T Corp., the parent company of AT&T Communications. SBC had already been offering its own long-distance services through SBC Long Distance LLC in its own territory in competition with other long-distance companies. As a result, AT&T Communications was refocused to seek new customers outside of the AT&T 13-state region served by its Bell Operating Companies.

In 2010, AT&T Communications (and subsidiary AT&T Communications of New England) was merged into AT&T Corp. In 2012, 17 more of the AT&T Communications companies were dissolved into AT&T Corp., leaving only the companies in Indiana, New York, Virginia, and Washington, D.C. as the last remnants of the 1984-created structure. On July 28, 2017, AT&T announced a new AT&T Communications corporate division, which will house AT&T Mobility, DirecTV, U-Verse, AT&T Business, and Technology and Operations Group.

Headquarters 
AT&T Communications is headquartered in Bedminster, New Jersey, at the AT&T Network Operations Center.

See also 
Long line (telecommunications)
TD-2

References

External links 
The Microwave Radio and Coaxial Cable Networks of the Bell System
Origins of ATT Microwave network

Former AT&T subsidiaries
Bell System
Defunct telecommunications companies of the United States
American companies established in 1984
Telecommunications companies established in 1984
Technology companies disestablished in 2010